Onésime Pelletier (April 5, 1833 – April 2, 1881) was a physician and political figure in Quebec. He represented Bellechasse in the Legislative Assembly of Quebec from 1867 to 1875 as a Liberal member.

He was born in Lavaltrie, Canada East, the son of Ambroise Pelletier and Louise-Sophie Giguère, and was educated at the Collège de l'Assomption and the Université Laval. He qualified to practice as a doctor in 1858 and set up practice in Saint-Charles. In 1859, he married Anselmie Blais. Pelletier was president of the Bellechasse Colonization Society. He was defeated by Pierre Fradet when he ran for reelection in 1875. Pelletier died in Saint-Charles at the age of 47.

References 
 

1857 births
1935 deaths
Quebec Liberal Party MNAs
Université Laval alumni